The Cathedral of Our Lady of the Holy Rosary is a cathedral belonging to the Catholic Church located in the city of Chittagong, the second largest city in Bangladesh. It is the seat, or cathedra, of the Roman Catholic Archdiocese of Chittagong.

The present cathedral was built during British rule in 1843 and the last renovation was in 1933.

See also
 Roman Catholicism in Bangladesh

References

Roman Catholic cathedrals in Bangladesh
Roman Catholic churches completed in 1843
Churches in Chittagong
19th-century Roman Catholic church buildings